Live in Amsterdam is the first live album by Candy Dulfer and contains prior hits such as "Sax-a-go-go," "Lily Was Here" and "Dance 'till You Bop," and new songs such as "Synchrodestiny."

The album features David A. Stewart, Hans Dulfer and Angie Stone as special guests. The album peaked at #27 in the Dutch album charts.

Track listing

Personnel

External links
 Official website

Candy Dulfer albums
2001 live albums
Ariola Records albums